The Rotherham by-election was a Parliamentary by-election held on 26 January 1916. The constituency returned one Member of Parliament (MP) to the House of Commons of the United Kingdom, elected by the first past the post voting system.

Vacancy
Rt Hon. Jack Pease had been Liberal MP for the seat of Rotherham since the 1910 Rotherham by-election. In 1916, he was appointed Postmaster General, an office of profit under the Crown and therefore required to seek re-election.

Electoral history
This was a safe Liberal seat and at the last General Election, Pease was re-elected comfortably;

Result
Due to the war-time electoral truce between the main parties, Pease did not face a Unionist or Labour Party opponent. He was returned unopposed.

Aftermath
Pease was made Baron Gainford in 1917 which resulted in the 1917 Rotherham by-election.

References

1916 in England
1916 elections in the United Kingdom
Elections in Rotherham
By-elections to the Parliament of the United Kingdom in South Yorkshire constituencies
1910s in Yorkshire
January 1916 events